Alexander Bennett "Ben" Sanders (February 16, 1865 – August 29, 1930) was an American Major League Baseball player who pitched a total of five seasons for three teams.

Career
Born in Catharpin, Virginia, Sanders debuted on June 6,  with the Philadelphia Quakers of the National League.  As a pitcher, he displayed good control, but he used an unorthodox delivery which ended with him off-balance, and with his back turned toward home plate. This made it difficult for him to react quickly on batted balls in his area of responsibility, particularly bunts.  On September 18 of that rookie season, Sanders lost a perfect game when his pitching opponent, Gus Krock, singled with one out in the 9th inning for the Chicago Colts. Sanders still achieved a 6–0 shutout victory.

He pitched two seasons for the Quakers, winning 38 games against 28 losses, including a rookie season in which he won 19 games, had a 1.90 earned run average, and led the league in shutouts with eight, and base on balls per 9 innings.

For the  season, Ben jumped to the newly created Players' League, and won 19 games and lost 18 for the Philadelphia Athletics who later joined the American Association for the  season.  He finished his career with the Louisville Colonels of the National League, playing his final game on October 14, 1892.  He had a record of 12-19, but on August 22, 1892, he pitched a no-hitter against the Baltimore Orioles, a 6–2 victory, the first no-hitter in the National League in which the losing team scored at least one run.

Post-career
Sanders died in Memphis, Tennessee, at the age of 65, and is interred at Sudley United Methodist Church Cemetery in his hometown of Catharpin, Virginia.

See also

List of Major League Baseball annual shutout leaders
List of Major League Baseball no-hitters

References

External links

Portraits from NYPL Digital Archive

1865 births
1930 deaths
19th-century baseball players
Major League Baseball pitchers
Philadelphia Quakers players
Philadelphia Athletics (PL) players
Philadelphia Athletics (AA 1891) players
Louisville Colonels players
Roanoke Maroons baseball players
Altoona (minor league baseball) players
Canton (minor league baseball) players
Baseball players from Virginia
People from Prince William County, Virginia
Burials in Virginia